Southern Vectis is a bus operator on the Isle of Wight. The company was founded in 1921 as "Dodson and Campbell" and became the "Vectis Bus Company" in 1923. The company was purchased by the Southern Railway before being nationalised in 1969. In 1987, the company was re-privatised. In July 2005, it became a subsidiary of Go-Ahead Group.

History

1921–1928
In 1921 in Cowes, the company was founded as "Dodson & Campbell". In 1923, the company was renamed the "Vectis Bus Company". "Vectis" is the Roman name for the Isle of Wight. The buses were built by the London bus body builder, Christopher Dodson.

1929–1985
In 1929, the company was purchased by Southern Railway and was incorporated as "The Southern Vectis Omnibus Company Limited".

In 1948, Southern Railway was nationalised and then in 1969, Southern Vectis became part of the National Bus Company.

1986–2004
In 1986, with deregulation after the passing of the Transport Act 1985, the business was sold in a management buy out. Five new operators entered the market on the Isle of Wight.

In 1987, Southern Vectis started Badger Vectis in Poole, and Solent Blue Line in Southampton. The new operations used older Southern Vectis buses and second-hand double-deckers. Southern Vectis also moved into other business areas on the isle of Wight. The company bought a self-drive van hire firm. It also bought two Ford Granada taxis, which it ran from the Cowes pontoon and began taxibus services which continued till 1989.

In 2003, Southern Vectis started "The Pink Peril", a school service using a pink bus.

2005–present
In July 2005, Southern Vectis and Solent Blue Line were sold to the Go-Ahead Group and became part of Go South Coast.

In April 2006, the network was changed with Newport the hub and other routes linking to it. Some routes, for example the "Island Explorer" were lost. However, the changes proved successful. Within 18 months, passenger numbers had increased by 45 percent. This included a 14 percent growth in fare-paying customers.

In October 2009, Southern Vectis launched a website promoting a car scrappage scheme, which offered Island residents a 12-month season ticket for bus journeys if they agreed to scrap their car. The company stated that five vehicles had been scrapped within the first fortnight of the promotion, and it had received around 6,000 enquiries.

In 2011, Southern Vectis closed its garage in Park Road, Ryde. It is now the site of the Isle of Wight Bus & Coach Museum though some Southern Vectis buses remain outstationed in the neighbouring yard. Most of the fleet is now based at the Nelson Road, Newport garage, with other outstations around the island. Another former garage, at Pier Street, Ventnor, was put up for auction in December 2020, with planning permission granted for two retail units and 10 flats to be built on the site, but then subsequently withdrawn.

On 13 June 2022, a consortium of Australia's Kinetic Group (51%) and Spain's Globalvia (49%) launched a takeover bid of the parent Go-Ahead Group. The majority of shareholders voted to accept the offer in August 2022.

Business practices in the deregulated market

As a result of deregulation in 1986, several competitors started and others increased existing services. These competitors included Gange's Minicoaches, Grand Hotel Tours, Island Travel (Cooke's Coaches of Porchfield), Moss Motor Tours, Seaview Services' RedLynx and Wiltax of Shanklin. Island Travel and Gange's Minicoaches established routes between Cowes and Ryde.

The newly privatised Southern Vectis responded with a number of new business practices. These practices raised the interest of the Office of Fair Trading who, in 1987, investigated the company and found their behaviour to be anti-competitive.

Duplication
It was alleged that Southern Vectis was engaged in "duplication", running buses immediately ahead of competitors' where routes coincided, and having their drivers lie in wait for competitors' vehicles in order to beat them to waiting passengers. In 1991, duplication tactics were seen again when Southern Vectis shadowed an Isle of Wight County Council contracted bus run by Norman Baker Taxis.

Bus station use

In 1986, Southern Vectis acquired Newport bus station as part of their privatisation and refused competitors access to it. The Office of Fair Trading report, published in 1988, found Southern Vectis' behaviour to be anti-competitive. Southern Vectis was told to either allow competitors to use the bus station or appear before the Competition Commission. Gange's Minicoaches, the plaintiff, was offered use of "Stand F" in Ryde bus station, and was also offered a stand in the Newport bus station. However, Gange's did not find the charges set for either station agreeable, and continued to operate from the opposite side of Ryde bus station on council land and the South Street bus stop in Newport, until their service discontinued.

Franchising
Southern Vectis started to franchise its routes. For instance, Southern Vectis franchised Solent Blue Line routes to Marchwood Motorways; the Newport Town Circular was franchised to M-Travel, and then the Alpha Group after M-Travel closed. The Traditional Bus Company and The Village Bus Company were franchised some open-top routes including the Shanklin Pony.

School bus services
In 2008, after its sale to Go-Ahead Group, Southern Vectis competed directly with the Isle of Wight Council's Wightbus school services. It duplicated routes and claimed term ticket fees for student passengers from the council. In September 2010, the Isle of Wight council engaged Southern Vectis to operate many school bus routes. Under the terms of the contract, the general public were not able to use these services. Services began in 2012 under Vectis Blue however in 2021 became integrated into Southern Vectis

Operations in 2000s
In 2009, Southern Vectis operated fifteen standard bus services, the most frequent being route 1, running every 7–8 minutes. Night buses ran on some routes on Friday and Saturday nights:

Open-top buses

Southern Vectis's "Open Top Tours" (orange and yellow livery) ran two circular summer routes to tourist destinations. In 2007, "Open top Tours" was rebranded to "Island Breezers" (yellow and blue livery). Other open-top tours operated by Southern Vectis included "The Needles Breezer", "The Downs Breezer", "The Sandown Bay Breezer" (finished 2012).

In 2007, an "Island Coaster" service started between Ryde and Alum Bay with a ten-pound all day ticket or longer period tickets for local residents. The Island Coaster followed the route of two former services, the "12" from Ryde to Sandown and the "7/7A" from Sandown to Alum Bay. Stops were at Freshwater Bay and Blackgang Chine, linking them with Ventnor, Shanklin, Sandown and Ryde. To get between Blackgang Chine and Brook near Brighstone, the service used the Military Road.

The 2008 season began on 15 March and finished on 2 November 2008. Some changes were made. Route number "X40" was removed (although still displayed on buses). There was no stop at the Bembridge Coast Hotel or Sandown Esplanade. In 2009, there was only one morning and one afternoon journey each way, one of which terminated or started in Shanklin rather than Ryde and reached from Freshwater Bay to Yarmouth, but not reaching Alum Bay. Coaches were used rather than buses.

In 2011, "The Shanklin Steamer" (to Old Village, Shanklin Esplanade, Shanklin Chine and the Shanklin railway station) commenced operation..

Tourist road trains

Until September 2009, three tourist road trains operated along the seafront of three island towns, Ryde, Shanklin and Sandown. The services were run by Southern Vectis under contract to Isle of Wight Council. In April 2010, it was announced that the vehicles would be retired due to increased maintenance costs. In January 2011, the Dotto Trains were sold to a dealer in Llandudno.

Vectis Blue coach transport
In July 2012, a new £28m school transport contract was made by the Isle of Wight council with Southern Vectis. New vehicles, Optare Solo SR M920s were ordered and arrived in September 2012. Some buses were transferred from the Go-Southcoast subsidiary, Damory Coaches formed of Volvo B12Ms with Alieeze T9 Bodywork Registered MV02. New double deckers ordered from Alexander Dennis were delivered in January 2013. Southern Vectis' involvement in coaching had varied through the years; early in the company's history the firm took no interest in coaching, preferring to leave the field to other operators. However, the company became involved in coaching through acquisition and conglomeration.

Some buses had previously been acquired from Fountain Coaches. The company had been assimilated into Southern Vectis when the National Bus Company rationalised in 1969. West Wight Bus & Coach Company and four of its coaches had been purchased by Southern Vectis in 1987. Moss Motor Tours was purchased by Southern Vectis in 1994. Wightrollers' eleven coaches were purchased by Go South Coast in July 2011. Southern Vectis employed staff from the firm.

Other services
The company has been involved in Isle of Wight events such as the Isle of Wight Festival and the Bestival. Additional buses were brought to the island. During the Isle of Wight Festival, extra shuttle services were run from Lymington to Yarmouth Wightlink ferry terminal; from the Southampton to East Cowes Red Funnel ferry terminal; and from the Portsmouth to Fishborne and Portsmouth to Ryde Wightlink ferry terminal and Fastcat passenger boat terminal.

An Open Top Christmas Lights Tour has been operated. One of the company's "Island Breezer" liveried buses took a two-hour journey past the most illuminated houses on the island. For the 2008 tour, a stop at the Old World Tea Rooms in Godshill was added for a complimentary mince pie and a hot drink.

In 2009, the company ran the "Sailbus" during Cowes Week. There was decreased patronage due to new fares and the service did not run the following year.

Fares and subsidies
Southern Vectis has increased its fares in reflection of its strong market position and lack of effective competition. Southern Vectis fares have also reflected the need to provide free transport to a relatively large population of elderly people who reside on the Isle of Wight.

Students under 19, in full-time education on the Isle of Wight, have received discounted fares under the Isle of Wight Council's Student Rider scheme. In July 2010 after cuts in funding from the UK government to local authorities, the scheme was ended.

Island residents and visitors living in England over the qualifying age or with a disability have travelled for free in the council area at any time of day, under the Government's England-wide scheme. In 2007, the Isle of Wight council reduced its reimbursement to Southern Vectis for free-travelling passengers from 76 percent to 46 percent. In 2009, concessionary travel accounted for just under half of all journeys on Southern Vectis buses. In 2010, free travel was restricted to off-peak times.

On 17 March 2008, Southern Vectis ended several evening, night and Sunday routes. More details about the service cuts emerged soon after. On 1 September 2008, routes 27, 28 and 29 ended.

In 2009, another subsidy decrease occurred. Routes 4 and 5, some journeys on route 6, routes 14 and 16 were withdrawn. In 2009, Southern Vectis staff went on strike for three days over pay.

In 2017, Southern Vectis introduced a contactless payment system for tickets. In 2021, Tap On Tap Off was introduced, a contactless ticket-free payment system enabling capped daily fares.

Fleet

In 2014, the company had 105 vehicles. These included Enviro 200's single deck buses replacing the Dennis Dart SLF's; seven Volvo B7TL/Plaxton President double deck buses of which two are open-top; twenty-eight Scania OmniCitys of which one has been converted to open-top following an engine fire; and sixteen Alexander Dennis Enviro 400's, of which six are on loan.

In 2016, the company took delivery of ten Alexander Dennis Enviro 400's, which replaced the five remaining closed top Volvo B7TL/Plaxton Presidents, and a tenth Enviro200 later that year. In 2017 Southern Vectis took delivery of their first "second generation" Alexander Dennis Enviro 400 MMC. In 2018, the company took delivery of 16 more with onboard "next stop" announcements and a more spacious and brighter interior. In 2019, Southern Vectis regained one of their old Dennis Dart/Plaxton Pointer MPD's, and a Scania OmniCity single decker.

Vectis Blue, the coach fleet, had twenty Alexander Dennis double deckers and around fifteen Optare Solos as well as a few vehicles acquired from Go South Coast subsidiaries. All of the coaches have seatbelts.

Livery
In April 2006, almost all the buses were painted in a new 'Best Impressions' livery with two shades of green with a new logo and slogan, "the island's buses". This livery was refreshed by Best Impressions in 2014 to incorporate a large green swoop towards the back of the vehicles, similar to the design of the Vectis Blue livery. Prior to 2014, most open-top routes had a blue and orange livery, with "Island Breezers" branding. This was revised in 2014, when the Needles Breezer received a blue, green and orange livery, reminiscent of Go South Coast's Purbeck Breezers. This livery was later rolled out to the rest of the Island Breezers fleet, as the buses were gradually replaced or repainted.

See also
 List of bus operators of the United Kingdom

References

Further reading

External links 

 
 

 
Bus operators on the Isle of Wight
Go South Coast companies
Transport on the Isle of Wight